Marienhafe is a municipality in the district of Aurich, in Lower Saxony, Germany.

References

Towns and villages in East Frisia
Aurich (district)